Corus albithorax is a species of beetle in the family Cerambycidae. It was described by Breuning in 1960.

Subspecies
 Corus albithorax albicollis (Breuning, 1970)
 Corus albithorax albithorax Breuning, 1960

References

albithorax
Beetles described in 1960